Piletocera flexiguttalis is a moth in the family Crambidae. It was described by Warren in 1896. It is found in India (Meghalaya).

References

flexiguttalis
Endemic fauna of India
Moths of Asia
Moths described in 1896